The Sackler Wing (1978) is a building designed by Kevin Roche, located to the north of the original Metropolitan Museum of Art building, is an addition built to house the Temple of Dendur, brought from Egypt to New York.

The wing was named after the Sackler family, associated with the Purdue Pharma company accused of fuelling the opioid crisis in the US. The Sacklers made a substantial donation to the Met for the construction of the wing, that's why it received their name. In 2021 the name Sackler was removed from several elements of the Met Museum, but no substitute name for this wing was proposed. Maps of the Met Museum show in 2023 no name for this particular wing, while the related one situated at the south side, The Michael C. Rockefeller Wing, remains well identified. The space within the Wing housing the temple is just Gallery 131.

History

The addition of the wing was part of a comprehensive architectural renewal plan for the Museum, devised by the then director of the Met, Thomas Hoving. Several additions were planned, with different donors, but in order to house the Egyptian temple of Dendur, Hoving calculated that 3.5 million dollars were needed. Arthur Sackler volunteered to offer that amount in 1967. In the negotiations that followed, names for several galleries and wings were assigned to the Sacklers, with personal mentions of the brothers Arthur, Mortimer and Raymond, each mentioned with the letters “M.D.” following his name in every signage associated. It was also stipulated that the money will come personally from the three doctors. However, the payment of the donation was to be paid over twenty years, so when the building had to be built, there wasn't enough cash and the city "ended up chipping in $1.4 million", according to journalist Patrick Radden Keefe in his book Empire of Pain.

The plan was approved in 1971. The Sackler Wing was complete by the end 1978, and the rest in 1991. All directed by Roche's architectural firm, Kevin Roche John Dinkeloo and Associates. The launch of a new exhibit was prepared for opening of the Wing, The Treasures of King Tut, showing objects from the tomb of Tutankhamun. Also a show by choreographer Martha Graham was commissioned for the opening by the Sacklers.

Other element of the ampliation was The Michael C. Rockefeller Wing, with the Andre Meyer Galleries above, which was added to the south. The adjacent corners were completed by the respective additions of the new American Wing and the Wallace Galleries for Twentieth Century Art.

When Kevin Roche died in 2019, The Sackler Wing was praised as one of his most notable achievements. Roche was a recipient of the Pritzker Architecture Prize, and it is customary that the presentation ceremonies of this prize pay homage to works done by previous laureates of the prize; following this tradition, the ceremony for laureate Ieoh Ming Pei in 1983 took place in the Sackler Wing.

The Sackler Wing hosted, until the name was dropped in 2021, several galleries also named after the Sackler family: The Sackler Wing Galleries (galleries 223–232), The Temple of Dendur in The Sackler Wing (Gallery 131) and The Sackler Gallery for Egyptian Art (Gallery 130).

In March 2018, the artist Nan Goldin and around 100 fellow activists of the PAIN group, threw pill bottles into the moat that is in the Wing, to protest sponsorship by the family that owned Purdue Pharma, producer and marketer of the opioid Oxycontin, associated to the opioid epidemic. PAIN's campaign, which continued in other art institutions asscoiated to the Sackler name, was finally successful: The Met announced in May 2019, that it would reject further contributions from the Sacklers; and in 2021, finally, the name was also dropped in a decision mutually agreed among the Museum and the descendants of Mortimer Sackler and Raymond Sacklerref. No substitute name for the wing has been proposed, apparently.

Gallery

References

Metropolitan Museum of Art
Sackler family
Roche-Dinkeloo buildings